The white-crowned robin-chat (Cossypha albicapilla) is a species of bird in the family Muscicapidae.
It is found in Benin, Burkina Faso, Cameroon, Central African Republic, Ivory Coast, Ethiopia, Gambia, Ghana, Guinea, Guinea-Bissau, Mali, Niger, Nigeria, Senegal, Sierra Leone, South Sudan, and Togo.
Its natural habitats are dry savanna and subtropical or tropical moist shrubland.

References

white-crowned robin-chat
Birds of Sub-Saharan Africa
Birds of West Africa
white-crowned robin-chat
Taxa named by Louis Jean Pierre Vieillot
Taxonomy articles created by Polbot
Taxobox binomials not recognized by IUCN